Porter Ingram (April 2, 1810 – December 3, 1893) was a prominent Confederate politician. He was born in Windham County, Vermont and later moved to Georgia. He represented the state in the First Confederate Congress in 1864, replacing Hines Holt, who had resigned.

1810 births
1893 deaths
Members of the Confederate House of Representatives from Georgia (U.S. state)
19th-century American politicians